Shekhar Koirala is a central working committee member of Nepali Congress and member of 2nd Federal Parliament of Nepal.

Political life 
He represented Morang district constituency number 6, which constitutes Western part of political town of Biratnagar. He was elected in the 2013 Nepalese Constituent Assembly election from the area. He previously served as vice chancellor of BPKIHS, an autonomous Health Science University. He was the person to garner highest number of votes for the post member of Nepali Congress Central Working Committee.

Personal life 
Dr. Koirala (शेखर कोइराला) was hospitalised at Norvic International Hospital after serious health problems. Back when his uncle B.P. Koirala was arrested, he was sent letter by Indian PM Morarji Desai to return to active politics in Nepal.

Birth and family 
He was born on 25 August 1950 to father Keshav Prasad Koirala and Nona Koirala belonging to Koirala family of politicians.

Medical profession 
He is a physician by profession. He worked at Bir Hospital, BPKIHS and Koshi Zonal Hospital.

See also 
 Shashanka Koirala

References 

Living people
Nepali Congress politicians from Koshi Province
1950 births
Nepalese physicians
People from Morang District
People from Biratnagar
S
Mahendra Morang Adarsh Multiple Campus alumni
Members of the 1st Nepalese Constituent Assembly
Members of the 2nd Nepalese Constituent Assembly
Nepal MPs 2022–present